Q39 may refer to:
 Q39 (New York City bus)
 Az-Zumar, a surah of the Quran